Outlast 2 (stylized as OU⸸LASTII) is a 2017 first-person psychological horror survival video game developed and published by Red Barrels. A sequel to the 2013 video game Outlast, the game features a journalist named Blake Langermann, along with his wife Lynn, roaming the Arizona desert to explore the murder of a pregnant woman only known as Jane Doe. Both get separated in a helicopter crash, and Blake has to find his wife while traveling through a village inhabited by a deranged sect that believes the end of days are upon them.

Shortly after the release and popularity of Outlast, Red Barrels announced the sequel. A gameplay demo was then released at both PAX East and E3 2016 on April 22 and June 15 respectively, with a release originally slated for Autumn 2016. Due to development delays, the game was ultimately released on April 25, 2017 for Microsoft Windows, PlayStation 4, and Xbox One. The Nintendo Switch version released on March 27, 2018 on the Nintendo eShop.

The game was met with generally positive reception upon release, with praise going towards the graphics, sound design, and atmosphere. Criticisms were reserved for the general story, context sensitive gameplay design, amount of gore, and difficulty. A third installment in the series, entitled The Outlast Trials, is set to be released in 2023.

Gameplay
Outlast 2 is a first-person survival horror game that, like its predecessors Outlast and Outlast: Whistleblower, is a single-player campaign. It is set in Northern Arizona. The game continues the found footage characteristics from the first game. The player controls the investigative journalist Blake Langermann, who investigates a dilapidated rural area in Supai, near the western edge of the Colorado Plateau.

Langermann cannot fight except in scripted scenes, but must run and hide from the numerous hostile members of Temple Gate. The player can crouch, run, jump, walk, vault, slide and climb much like the first game and can hide in lockers, barrels, wardrobes, beds, pools of water, tall grass, cornfields, and inside of houses. He has a limited stamina meter and the player must manage how long he runs, lest he becomes exhausted and move more slowly.

Langermann possesses only a camcorder, which has night vision capabilities, though the camcorder's batteries are also drained when night vision is used. Compared to the first game, Langermann's status as a cameraman means he carries a more advanced camera, one with clearer footage, zoom, and a sensitive microphone that can be used to detect distant footsteps and other noises. The player is equipped with an inventory system displaying the amount of footage recorded on the camera and the items they are carrying. Spare batteries suitable for the camcorder and medkits to heal are spread throughout the game.

Plot
Blake Langermann is an assisting cameraman for his wife Lynn, an investigative journalist, who is investigating the murder of a pregnant teenager known only as Jane Doe. The couple has a helicopter pilot fly them over the area where the girl possibly came from, although they crash-land in the Supai region of the Coconino County region of Arizona after being hit by a mysterious flash of light. When Blake wakes up after the crash he finds the pilot skinned alive and his wife missing. 

Blake makes his way to a nearby town, Temple Gate, where he learns that the residents sacrificed all their children in the name of God. Blake eventually locates Lynn in a chapel, captured by a violent and delirious Christian cult led by preacher Sullivan Knoth, who rapes the women of Temple Gate and, once they are pregnant, executes them on suspicion of carrying the Anti-Christ. Knoth claims that Temple Gate lies on the mouth of Hell, and that Lynn is pregnant with the Anti-Christ. They escape the chapel, but Lynn falters, suffering from stomach cramps. The couple is separated when Lynn is kidnapped by a Satanic splinter group known as the Heretics and their androgynous leader Val, who wish to hasten the end of days by witnessing the birth of the Anti-Christ.

Blake is rescued by a man named Ethan who has left Knoth's cult and gives him refuge in his home. It is revealed that Ethan's daughter Anna Lee is Jane Doe after he explains that he helped her escape Temple Gate. As Blake rests, Marta, an imposing woman wielding a large pickaxe and who is one of Knoth's executioners, suddenly breaks into Ethan's home and murders him. Blake flees to another chapel, where he learns from a tortured Heretic being interrogated by Knoth that Lynn was taken to the mines near Temple Gate.

Blake leaves Temple Gate for the mines but instead ends up in the forests occupied by the syphilis-infected 'Scalled' who were cast out from Temple Gate. He is captured by the Scalled's dwarfish leader Laird Byron and his hulking mount Nick Tremblay, who believe he is the Scalled Messiah. Blake eventually escapes after Laird's followers kill him and Nick.

Throughout his journey, Blake is repeatedly assaulted by flashes of light and suffers from increasingly disturbing hallucinations of his Catholic elementary school while pursued by a demon. The hallucinations gradually reveal the events surrounding the apparent suicide of Blake and Lynn's childhood friend, Jessica Gray. It is ultimately revealed that Jessica was molested and murdered by their music teacher, Father Loutermilch, who manipulated Blake into keeping quiet about the incident while making it look like she had hanged herself, and the demon chasing Blake is a twisted version of the priest. Blake also finds a document revealing that the Murkoff Corporation is the cause for everyone's insanity due to an experimental mind control station hidden deep in the mountains, which is also responsible for the flashes of light.

Reaching the mines, Blake enters the Heretics' underground temple and finds Lynn visibly pregnant during a Heretic ritual. Knoth's cult also reach the mines and kill the Heretics, allowing the pair to flee. As dawn breaks, a freak lightning storm begins to destroy the town. Marta reappears and attacks Blake and Lynn, but a cross toppled by lightning from a chapel in the distance impales her. Taking shelter from the storm, Lynn gives birth but dies in the process and Blake blacks out holding the newborn, implied to be a hallucination by Lynn's last words and the baby's lack of a shadow. 

Knoth greets Blake as he wakes up. He claims that he had to kill all of his followers, and implores Blake to kill the child before slitting his own throat. As Blake walks outside, he finds that Knoth's followers have committed mass suicide via poisoning in preparation for the apocalypse. The sun grows brighter and Blake is engulfed by the light. He has a final vision of chasing Jessica through the school; when he catches her, she promises that she will never let him go, and they start praying.

Development
After the successful release and development of Outlast, Red Barrels confirmed the development of Outlast 2 on October 23, 2014. It was also reported that the characters and setting would be greatly different in comparison to the first game, as players wouldn't return to Mount Massive in the sequel. In an interview with Bloody Disgusting, co-founder Philippe Morin stated that "we really want to keep improving our craft, but ultimately we'll approach things the same way."

On October 28, on both Red Barrels's Facebook and Twitter accounts, a post featured a bulletin board with documents posted saying, "Classified", and the word "Tomorrow" across the picture. The next day, the teaser trailer for the game was released on their YouTube account.

On January 26, 2016, when asked about the possibility of being released simultaneously and pre-order, Red Barrels replied that it might be possible but were not exactly sure. February 5, Morin was interviewed by Indie Games Level Up! about the game, in which he stated that it was largely based on the Jonestown massacre of 1978. On April 4, a video named "Jude 1:14-15" was released by Red Barrels. Unlike other teasers, the video contains a cross of St. Peter across a background of clouds, with an ominous backmasked audio message. Played in reverse, the message reads:"Children, you lovers of God and registration defenders of His paradise—all our years of suffering come together now on this glorious day of peace... Peace! Even in the corrupt and filthy tongue of the Romans, in the Puritan city... On the fourth month and the twenty-second day of the sixteenth year of the third millennium, our reckoning begins. The spider-eyed lamb waits at the harlot's brace, hungry for this world! Ready your knives, for the good earth thirsts for blood, and we, like the angels, must show no mercy. God loves you."On April 23, the game demo was showcased and released at PAX East 2016 and E3 2016 on June 15. On August 26, Samuel Laflamme, the original composer for Outlast, officially announced his return to compose the game's soundtrack, as well as the upcoming possibility of another teaser.

Unlike the previous game, Outlast 2 does not feature any downloadable content. The developer stated, "while the first Outlast was made with the idea of a DLC in mind, that was not the case for Outlast 2. We’ve considered many options, but none of them felt appropriate for a DLC. Outlast 2 was created to make you feel like a rat in a maze, without any knowledge of what’s outside the maze."

Soundtrack

The game soundtrack, composed by Samuel Laflamme, was released on April 25, 2017. The album contains 14 original tracks composed by Laflamme, as well as an excerpt from Ave verum corpus composed by Wolfgang Amadeus Mozart on track 14 "you Never let me go". Contrasting to the original game, Outlasts  soundtrack, which focuses on orchestral arrangements, Laflamme focused on utilizing instruments such as guitars, bass guitars, percussion, and instruments he and his team made himself. Laflamme then modulates and tweaks these sounds through a process called Modular Filtering.

In order to achieve the desired sounds for the game without the use of an orchestra, Laflamme created an instrument consisting of a metal string attached to a piece of wood. He then used this instrument throughout the score as the instrument "really fit with the overall score". The soundtrack is available on all streaming platforms, and was released in the 1st quarter of 2019 as a Double LP Vinyl Set featuring the music of the first and second game, respectively on two Glow in the Dark and Black Splatter vinyl pressings. Each capital letter of the track-listing spells the word "Redemption", with the album consisting of 14 tracks in total.

Release
The game was made available digitally on April 25, 2017 for Microsoft Windows, PlayStation 4, and Xbox One. Alongside the digital launch, Outlast Trinity, a physical collection of the Outlast series was also released. The game was originally slated for Fall 2016 release as stated on the teaser trailer, however, on August 1, the company announced that the game's release would be postponed until Q1 2017.

About a month prior to release, the Australian Classification Board refused to grant Outlast 2 an "R18+" rating, the most extreme it can grant video games, citing that the game depicts "sexual violence"; without a rating, the game cannot be sold in Australian stores. Ultimately, after a few days, the board reversed its decision without any modifications to the game and rated the game as "R18+", eventually permitting it to be sold.

In July 2016, Red Barrels announced The Murkoff Account, a six issue online comic book series that follows Murkoff Insurance Litigation agents Paul Marion and Pauline Glick, better known as the Pauls, whose job is to make sure that Murkoff is not paying more than it needs to in order to protect the company's interests. Their story bridges the gap between the first Outlast all the way to the end of Outlast 2.

In December 2017, Red Barrels announced that Outlast 2, along with Outlast and its downloadable content, would be coming to the Nintendo Switch in early 2018.

Due to feedback from players and critics alike, Red Barrels released an update in March 2018 with a new difficulty mode called "Story Mode." The difficulty mode decreases the number of enemies as well as their speed, damage and perception. Players can still die in the game but "Story Mode" allows them to have more time to explore the environments and be immersed in the story. The update additionally reinstated some content that was initially removed to get an M rating as opposed to an Adults Only rating.

Reception

Outlast 2 received "generally positive" reviews from critics but received "mixed or average" reviews for the PlayStation 4 version.

Destructoids Nic Rowen scored the game an 8/10 with the consensus "Impressive effort with a few noticeable problems holding it back. Won't astound everyone, but is worth most people's time and cash."

James Kozanitis from Game Revolution gave the game a score of 4.5 out of 5 stars saying that "A good horror game should make you dread the idea of playing it, but keep you glued to the screen while you actually are. Outlast 2 is that game. While more involved fans might be disappointed as to how the story resolves, I found it hit the sweet spot between overly expository and frustratingly vague. Segments from Outlast 2 are forever burned into my memories, acting as much as a traumatic experience as it was an exhilarating one. The thematic elements present throughout make the game even more high-stakes, taking a toll on you as a moral human being. God doesn't love Outlast 2 – not like I do."

Louise Blain of GamesRadar+ awarded it 2.5 out of 5 stars stating that, "Horrific in completely the wrong way, Outlast 2 is a night-vision journey into frustration. An intriguing story just can't save the infuriating misery that awaits."

Lucy O'Brien's score of 8.3/10 on IGN said that "Outlast 2 is a terrifying successor to the 2013 original that keeps the scares coming at a relentless pace."

"Stealth and pursuit haven't changed much in Outlast 2, but it excels as a beautiful, brutal journey through extreme spiritual anxieties," was James Davenport's conclusion on PC Gamer with a score of 85/100.

7.5/10 was Philip Kollar's score on Polygon with the consensus: "Outlast 2 may be the single most qualified recommendation I've given in my history of writing reviews, and not just because of its occasionally stilted design. This is a game that often left me feeling like complete trash. It brought up some of the most difficult memories in my life, issues I had buried long ago. My reactions to that anguish have run the gamut, but more than anything, I respect that Outlast 2 has the singular focus and intensity to dredge up those emotions; that alone made it worth the time spent for me."

Alice Bell's 6/10 score on VideoGamer.com stated that "Outlast 2 has some great design elements, and the night-vision handy-cam mechanic is still scary. But the jump scares and gore don't mix right with the elements of psychological horror, and the story retreads horror tropes that didn't need retreading."

The game was nominated for "Use of Sound, Franchise" at the National Academy of Video Game Trade Reviewers Awards.

Future

Sequel
Outlast 3 was announced in December 2017, though no time frame or target platforms were confirmed. During this announcement, Red Barrels said that because they could not easily add downloadable content for Outlast 2 due to its structure, they have a smaller separate project related to Outlast that will release before Outlast 3, that project being The Outlast Trials.

Prequel
The Outlast Trials is an upcoming horror game that was teased in October 2019 and is not a direct sequel to Outlast 2.  It's about test subjects in a mysterious Cold War experiment and set in the same universe of the previous games. Red Barrels co-founder David Chateauneuf said the proof of concept is now complete and the game's team is now in development mode. It is set to be released sometime in 2023.

Notes

References

External links
 

2017 video games
Censored video games
Video games about cults
Video games about mental health
Rape in fiction
Nintendo Switch games
PlayStation 4 games
PlayStation 4 Pro enhanced games
Psychological horror games
Psychological thriller video games
Red Barrels games
Single-player video games
Survival video games
Unreal Engine games
Video game sequels
Indie video games
Video games about religion
Video games about Satanism
Video games about suicide
Video games developed in Canada
Video games set in 2013
Video games set in the United States
Video games set in Arizona
Windows games
Xbox One games
Xbox One X enhanced games